An election to Louth County Council took place on 23 May 2014 as part of that year's Irish local elections. 29 councillors were elected from four electoral divisions by PR-STV voting for a five-year term of office.
Ahead of the 2014 election Louth was redrawn into four electoral areas, a reduction of one from five, and the number of councillors was increased to 29, from a previous total of 26. Drogheda Borough Council, Dundalk Town Council and Ardee Town Council were all abolished.

Results by party

Results by Electoral Area

Ardee

Drogheda

Dundalk Carlingford

Dundalk South

References

Changes since 2014
† Drogheda Fine Gael Cllr Kevin Callan resigned from the party on 2 November 2014 and became an Independent in opposition to the government's handling of the water charges controversy .
†† Drogheda Sinn Féin Cllr Imelda Munster was elected as a TD for Louth at the Irish general election, 2016. Joanne Byrne was co-opted to fill the vacancy on 21 March 2016.
††† Dundalk-South Fianna Fáil Cllr Declan Breathnach was elected as a TD for Louth at the Irish general election, 2016. Emma Coffey was co-opted to fill the vacancy on 21 March 2016.
†††† Dundalk-Carlingford Sinn Féin Councillor Jim Loughran resigned his seat for health reasons in October 2016. Antoin Watters was co-opted to fill the vacancy on 21 November 2016.
††††† Drogheda Sinn Féin Councillor Alan Cassidy resigned his seat in May 2017 citing family reasons. Davin Saurin was co-opted to fill the vacancy.
†††††† Dundalk-South Sinn Féin Councillor Kevin Meenan resigned his seat on 21 July 2017 citing health reasons. Ruairi O Mhurcu was co-opted to fill the vacancy on 18 September 2017.
††††††† Dundalk-South Sinn Féin Councillor Jennifer Green resigned her seat citing family reasons. Anne Campbell was co-opted to fill the vacancy on 18 September 2017.

External links
 Official website

2014 Irish local elections
2014